Lone Rock Township may refer to:

Lone Rock Township, Baxter County, Arkansas, in Baxter County, Arkansas
Lone Rock Township, Moody County, South Dakota, in Moody County, South Dakota

Township name disambiguation pages